Isaac Finch (October 13, 1783 – June 23, 1845) was a U.S. Representative from New York.

Born in Stillwater, New York, Finch moved with his parents to Peru, New York, in 1787.
He attended the public schools.
He studied law, but did not engage in extensive practice.
He settled near Jay, New York, and became interested in agricultural pursuits.
He served as major in the Twenty-sixth Regiment of Infantry during the War of 1812.
He was a member of the New York State Assembly (Essex Co.) in 1822 and 1824.

Finch was elected as an Anti-Jacksonian to the 21st United States Congress, holding office from  March 4, 1829, to March 3, 1831. Afterwards he resumed his agricultural pursuits.
He died in Jay, New York, on June 23, 1845.
He was interred in Central Cemetery.

References

1783 births
1845 deaths
Members of the New York State Assembly
People from Jay, New York
United States Army officers
People from Stillwater, New York
People from Peru, New York
National Republican Party members of the United States House of Representatives from New York (state)
19th-century American politicians